In software development, a README file contains information about the other files in a directory or archive of computer software. A form of documentation, it is usually a simple plain text file called README, Read Me, READ.ME, README.TXT, README.md (to indicate the use of Markdown), or README.1ST.

The file's name is generally written in uppercase. On Unix-like systems in particular, this causes it to stand outboth because lowercase filenames are more common, and because the ls command commonly sorts and displays files in ASCII-code order, in which uppercase filenames will appear first.

Contents
A README file typically encompasses:

 Configuration instructions
 Installation instructions
 Operating instructions
 A file manifest (a list of files in the directory or archive)
 Copyright and licensing information
 Contact information for the distributor or author
 A list of known bugs
 Troubleshooting instructions
 Credits and acknowledgments
 A changelog (usually aimed at fellow programmers)
 A news section (usually aimed at end users)

History 
It is unclear when the convention of including a README file began, but examples dating to the mid-1970s have been found. Early Macintosh system software installed a Read Me on the Startup Disk, and README files commonly accompanied third-party software.

In particular, there is a long history of free software and open-source software including a README file; the GNU Coding Standards encourage including one to provide "a general overview of the package".

Since the advent of the web as a de facto standard platform for software distribution, many software packages have moved (or occasionally, copied) some of the above ancillary files and pieces of information to a website or wiki, sometimes including the README itself, or sometimes leaving behind only a brief README file without all of the information required by a new user of the software. 

The popular source code hosting website GitHub strongly encourages the creation of a README fileif one exists in the main (top-level) directory of a repository, it is automatically presented on the repository's front page. In addition to plain text, various other formats and file extensions are also supported, and HTML conversion takes extensions into accountin particular a README.md is treated as GitHub Flavored Markdown.

As a generic term
The expression "readme file" is also sometimes used generically, for other files with a similar purpose. For example, the source-code distributions of many free software packages (especially those following the Gnits Standards or those produced with GNU Autotools) include a standard set of readme files:
{| class="wikitable"
|-
|README
|General information
|-
|AUTHORS
|Credits
|-
|THANKS
|Acknowledgments
|-
|CHANGELOG
|A detailed changelog, intended for programmers
|-
|NEWS
|A basic changelog, intended for users
|-
|INSTALL
|Installation instructions
|-
|COPYING / LICENSE
|Copyright and licensing information
|-
|BUGS
|Known bugs and instructions on reporting new ones
|-
|CONTRIBUTING / HACKING
|Guide for prospective contributors to the project
|-
|}

Also commonly distributed with software packages are an FAQ file and a TODO file, which lists planned improvements.

See also
 FILE_ID.DIZ
 DESCRIPT.ION
 .nfo
 man page

Notes

References

Further reading
  
 
  
  

Software documentation
Filenames